William Field may refer to:

William Field (minister) (1768–1851), English Unitarian minister
William Field (American politician) (1790–1878), Lieutenant Governor of Connecticut, 1855–1856
William Field (Irish politician) (1848–1935), Nationalist (Parnellite) Member of Parliament for Dublin St Patrick's, 1892–1918
William Field (Australian pastoralist) (1774–1837), convict turned Tasmanian businessman
William Field (cricketer) (1816–1890), Tasmanian cricketer
William Hughes Field (1861–1944), Member of Parliament in New Zealand
R. William Field, academic at the University of Iowa
William R. Field (1907–1988), Irish-born priest in Nigeria
William W. Field (1824–1907), American politician, 16th Speaker of the Wisconsin State Assembly
William Field, 1st Baron Field (1813–1907), English judge
Billy Field (singer) (born 1953), Australian singer/songwriter
Billy Field (Gaelic footballer) (born 1952), Irish former Gaelic footballer
Bill Field (1909–2002), British Labour Party Member of Parliament for Paddington North, 1946–1953

See also 
William Field Porter (1784–1869), New Zealand politician
William Fields (disambiguation)
William Todd Field (born 1964), American actor and filmmaker